Jim Norman is a former Republican member of the Florida Senate from 2010 to 2012, representing the 12th District, which included a portion of Hillsborough county and all of Pasco county.

Political career

2010 Florida Senate Primary Election
In 2010, Hillsborough County Commissioner Jim Norman filed to run against Kevin Ambler in the Senate District 12 Primary Election. Norman had volunteered on Ambler's previous campaigns for the House District 47 seat and had expressed his intentions to run for the seat when Ambler reached term-limits. Instead, he filed to run against Ambler for the Senate seat at the last second.

During the campaign, news broke that Norman had failed to disclose a  Arkansas vacation home "given" to his wife, Mearline, by Ralph Hughes. Hughes was the millionaire founder of Cast-Crete, pre-cast concrete products used in construction jobs around the county. The east Hillsborough County power broker benefited over the years from the county's pro-development decisions and was a longtime friend of Norman.

Salvation Army scandal
Questions about Jim Norman's employment at the Salvation Army arose during the heated primary election campaign. The charity paid him $95,000 a year for work that Norman said is done largely on weekends and provided him with a car. During the 2010 Primary Election, Norman was photographed using the vehicle for political activity, jeopardizing the Salvation Army's tax exempt status. Salvation Army officials stated that donors are complained about Norman being on the charity's payroll. At least a dozen readers sent letters or e-mails to the Saint Petersburg Times expressing their disappointment in the charity's handling of the Norman issue.

On August 24, 2010, Norman defeated Ambler by just under 4 thousand votes

Norman v. Ambler
Kevin Ambler first disclosed Hughes' gift to Mearline Norman in a lawsuit seeking to overturn his August 2010 Republican Primary loss Norman. In the lawsuit, Ambler argued that Norman was not qualified to run because he failed to disclose the gift for the Arkansas home on state ethics forms.

During the proceedings, the Normans testified that Mearline partnered with Hughes, who gave her money to buy and furnish a home. Norman insisted he didn't disclose the house because he doesn't own it and had no knowledge of his wife's partnership with Hughes.

Jim Norman kicked off ballot
During the October trial, Leon County circuit judge Jackie Fulford stated that she found Norman's explanation that he knew nothing about the house, "patently absurd," and ordered him off the ballot.

Former State Rep. Rob Wallace named to replace Norman on ballot
As provided under state law, six Republican representatives from Hillsborough and Pasco counties selected the candidate to replace Norman on the 2010 General Election ballot, choosing former State Rep. Rob Wallace. Wallace served eight years in the Florida House from 1994-2002 and was succeeded by Ambler

1st District Court of Appeal restores Norman to ballot
Norman appealed Fulford's decision and a three-judge panel of the 1st District Court of Appeal reversed the lower court, placing Norman back on the ballot. During the appeal, the judge noted that Norman could still face perjury charges, but it is up to the Legislature to remove a candidate from the ballot based on a recommendation of the Commission of Ethics.

After being reinstated, Norman won the general election against two write-in candidates. Despite the token opposition, however, 45,573 voters cast ballots for someone other than Norman.

FBI and Grand Jury investigation
After the story aired, the FBI and a Grand Jury began investigation of Norman.

State Commission on Ethics investigation
In response to the media coverage, ethics complaints were filed against Norman by Tampa attorney Paul Phillips and by Dover activist George Niemann.  According to Phillips' complaint, Mrs. Norman had no obvious known source of income which would allow for the purchase of a $435,000 lake front home. Phillips' complaint claimed Ralph Hughes fronted the money and that it constituted either an unreported loan or unreported income. The Normans refused to release their income tax returns to clear the answer to that question. Phillips' complaint noted that the home was sold to the Normans by Ed Roleson, Jr. a now deceased former Miller Beer Co. distributor. The real estate transaction was conducted around the same time the Tampa Sports Authority (which Norman served on) approved a patio deck in the south end-zone of Raymond James Stadium for Miller Beer. Phillips alleged Norman's solely listing his wife on the title to the house was "done deliberately to conceal an obvious conflict of interest for Mr. Norman and illegal gift to him and/or his spouse."

2012 Primary Election
Because of redistricting, Jim Norman had to again run for the State Senate in 2012. Norman filed for reelection, but later withdrew, following a corruption scandal that involved him accepting favors from various industry lobbyists.

2016 Primary Election
Jim Norman attempted to rejoin the Hillsborough County Commission in 2016, but was defeated by Tim Schock in the Primary Election.

Electoral history

References

1953 births
Republican Party Florida state senators
Living people